Lalla (c. 720–790) was an Indian mathematician and astronomer.

Lalla may also refer to:

People
Lalla of Arneae (fl. c. 80–c. 100), Graeco-Roman civic benefactor
Lalla Latifa (born c. 1945), mother of current King of Morocco
Lalla Fatma N'Soumer (c. 1830–1863), member of Kabyle resistance againt French colonial army
Lalla Ward (born 1951), English actress 
Lalleshwari (1320–1392), Indian mystic
Princess Lalla Salma of Morocco (born 1978 as Salma Bennani), consort of the current King of Morocco

Other uses 
Lalla (title), an Amazigh (berber) title of respect

 Lalla, Tasmania, a town in Tasmania, Australia

See also
Lalla Rookh (disambiguation)
Lallans, a Scots word used to mean the lowlands of Scotland or Scots language
Lallation (disambiguation)